The Debut is a 2000 American independent drama film directed and co-written by first-time Filipino American filmmaker Gene Cajayon. It is the first Filipino American film to be released theatrically nationwide, starting in March 2001 in the San Francisco Bay Area and ending in November 2002 in New York City.
It is also one of the first feature films to take place within the Filipino American community, one of the largest Asian ethnic minorities in America. The title of the film refers to the traditional coming-of-age ceremony accompanying a young woman’s 18th birthday in Filipino culture.

The film grossed a very respectful $1.745 million in limited theatrical release in the United States.

Synopsis
Ben Mercado (Dante Basco) is a talented high school senior who enrolls in a prestigious arts institute in order to realize his dreams of becoming an artist. However, his plans come into conflict with those of his strict immigrant father Roland (Tirso Cruz III), a postal worker intent on seeing Ben become a doctor. Their long-simmering feud—for Ben, a struggle to be accepted by America and therefore reject his Filipino heritage; and for Roland, a quest to give his children a better life than he had—threatens to boil over and ruin the elaborate eighteenth birthday party of Ben’s sister Rose (Bernadette Balagtas). However, it is at the party where everything starts to change for Ben. The celebration emerges as a cultural stew of old world traditions and contemporary urban lifestyle, challenging Ben’s sense of misplaced identity, his choice of friends, even the way he regards his father. He also finds an unexpected confidante (and perhaps a love interest) in Rose’s best friend Annabelle (Joy Bisco). However, the evening’s challenges to Ben are just beginning to surface. The arrival of the Mercado family’s overbearing patriarch (Eddie Garcia) exacerbates tensions between father and son, while the temptation to ditch the relatives to be with his white friends at a kegger across town tugs at Ben throughout the evening. Worse, his budding romance with Annabelle is complicated by the presence of hot-headed Augusto (Darion Basco), a former boyhood friend-turned gangsta wannabe—and Annabelle’s ex. In one night, Ben will face the true nature of his relationships with his family, his friends, and himself.

Cast

Production
The Debut is based on a ten-minute short film Cajayon had made as his thesis project at Loyola Marymount University in Los Angeles, California, United States. He incorporated themes from co-writer John Manal Castro's short film, Diary of a Gangsta Sucka. The full-length film took eight years to produce and raise funding for (from 1992 to 2000), another year to be released in theaters, and two years to go on DVD in 2003 and television.

After shooting the first ten minutes of his thesis project, Cajayon sent the movie script to potential private financial backers but was turned down. Cajayon and Castro shopped the film to every major Hollywood studio (Disney, Warner Bros., MGM, Paramount, 20th Century Fox, Columbia, Universal), but were rebuffed.

At one point, producer Dean Devlin, who is half Filipino, became associated with the project, but the film was still unable to secure funding. Eventually the film was able to garner a grant from the NAATA (National Asian American Telecommunications Association). Cajayon tapped Picture Bride producer Lisa Onodera, Greg Spence, and Celestial Pictures to produce the film. Adult roles in the movie were cast in the Philippines, where casting director Ernest Eschaler held casting sessions in Manila. The filmmakers were able to cast Tirso Cruz III, Gina Alajar, Eddie Garcia, and comedian Fe de los Reyes.

Back in the US, the filmmakers put out a casting call for the lead character, eventually selecting Dante Basco, who played Rufio in the 1991 Steven Spielberg film Hook. Actress Joy Bisco was cast as the female lead. In addition to Dante Basco in the lead role, the film also features other members of the Basco family (Derek, Darion, Dion, and Arianna).

Production started on October 21, 1997 at the Cantwell-Sacred Heart of Mary High School in Montebello, California. Reshoots were done a year after production finished. The musical score and licensing of songs for the soundtrack was done in 1999.

The film had its world premiere as the Opening Night Attraction of the 15th Annual Los Angeles Asian Pacific Film & Video Festival on May 18, 2000.

Early success
Prior to the film's theatrical release in 2001, the film was shown at various film festivals around the United States, including the Hawaii International Film Festival (HIFF) in November 2000. American film critic Roger Ebert, in attendance, was given a private screening of the film and gave the film a "thumbs up." The Debut won the 2000 HIFF Audience Award for Best Feature Film, beating out heavily favored Crouching Tiger, Hidden Dragon.

Theatrical release
The Debut’s success on the film festival circuit inspired the filmmakers to launch a theatrical self-distribution campaign. For two years, The Debut’s promotional team (consisting of Cajayon, co-writer John Castro, associate producer Patricio Ginelsa, and a full-time staff of five) traveled to fifteen major cities across the United States and promoted the film directly to Asian Pacific American and mainstream communities. TV commercials were shown on local channels and on local cable systems. The Debut eventually grossed $1.745 million at the box office and won a 2001 Ammy Award for Best Independent Feature Film. The Debut was released in the Philippines by Columbia Pictures on August 13, 2003.

The film's success in theaters led to a domestic and international distribution deal with Sony Pictures. The film has been made available for home viewing on iTunes, Amazon Video, and VUDU.

Reception
The film received positive reviews. On Rotten Tomatoes, the film has a 74% "fresh" rating based on 24 reviews. The site’s consensus stated, “Although The Debut offers few surprises, it remains an engaging and well-acted look at the multi-generational immigrant experience.”

Film critics like Roger Ebert of the Chicago Sun Times and Kevin Thomas of the Los Angeles Times applauded the movie. It won the Best Narrative Feature award at the San Diego Asian Film Festival.

References

External links
 . Wayback Machine. Archived from the original on 2001-04-01.
 
 The Debut at Rotten Tomatoes 
 Director Gene Cajayon's official website

2001 films
2000s teen drama films
Films about Filipino Americans
American coming-of-age drama films
Features based on short films
American teen drama films
2001 drama films
Asian-American drama films
Films about Filipino families
2000s coming-of-age drama films
Films shot in Los Angeles County, California
Films about father–son relationships
Films about families
2000 independent films
2000s American films